, stylized as , is a video game developer company founded at 2016 by Masamitsu Niitani (founder of the former company Compile and the creator of Puyo Puyo) as a new venture.

History 
Niitani decided to found Compile Maru to publish his new development, Nyoki Nyoki, and as a new venture after the company he previously founded Compile.

In an interview with Fumio Kurokawa, Niitani talks about the success of Puyo Puyo and how a game potentially on par with Tetris grew the company he founded in 1982. He also mentions that "entrepreneurship is 'but me', and there are no objectives" and "the common people only know tactics", criticizing the big companies and their commercial objectives. He also mentions that "the opportunity to start a business is 'alone or as a company'", which led him to create his own company Compile, spirit that he would maintain throughout his life when he founded Compile Maru and developed Nyoki Nyoki.

Video games developed 
 Nyoki Nyoki: Tabidachi Hen for the Nintendo 3DS, based on Pochi and Nyaa
 , video game similar to Puyo Puyo but with dominoes, available for download at the Project EGG

References

See also 
 Compile, former company founded by Niitani
 Compile Heart, company founded after the Compile bankrupt

Video game companies of Japan
Video game development companies
Compile (company) games
Video game companies established in 2016
Japanese companies established in 2016